Connolly's Grist and Saw Mills were formerly located at East Point, Georgia.

Joseph Connolly migrated from his native Ireland to Dekalb County in the mid-1830s. He settled lands that were ceded by the Creek (Muscogian) Indians to Georgia in 1821.  The local government known as Fulton County was created out of part of DeKalb County in 1853. Mr. Connolly established two mills along the tributaries of Utoy Creek.  The first was a grist mill on the Connolly family plantation farm that supplied local farmers with the means to grind dried corn into meal and grits. This mill was mentioned in the reports of Lowery's Confederate Brigade. Major General Patrick Cleburne's  Infantry Division of Hardees Confederate Army Corps was posted along a ridge adjacent to the mill.

The saw mill was built three-quarters of a mile away from the grist mill, on the main branch of South Utoy Creek—now the middle of GA Hwy 166.  The large millpond supported the local lumber business. During the American Civil War, this millpond was noted as an obstacle to the US (Union) Forces of the XXIII Army Corps, Hascall's division, who attempted to break the line near the Connolly Grist Mill on August 18, 1864.  The local Hopewell Church was destroyed by Union Army artillery fire during this engagement as the spire was used to aim at the opposing line.

The two mills were in operation until 1910–1911, when the discovery that malaria was carried by mosquitoes led to the draining of the millponds by the US Army. Flash floods had destroyed the Connolly Grist Mill on three previous occasions.

A third Connolly mill was established on a smaller tributary of Utoy Creek, adjacent to the current Headland Road in the "Frog Hollar" community. It was also destroyed by a flash flood and never rebuilt.

References

Buildings and structures in Fulton County, Georgia
Sawmills in the United States
Grinding mills in Georgia (U.S. state)
East Point, Georgia